Miami Valley College, initially called Miami Valley Institute, was a college in Springboro, Ohio.  It was founded in 1870 by Aron Wright and other Quakers.  Wright served as its president until 1879 and the college closed in 1883.

References

1870 establishments in Ohio
1883 disestablishments in Ohio
Private universities and colleges in Ohio
Education in Warren County, Ohio